Heinz Salfner (31 December 1877 – 13 October 1945) was a German stage and film actor. Salfner appeared in more than sixty films during his career. He played the lead in the 1932 crime film A Shot at Dawn.

Selected filmography
 The Skull of Pharaoh's Daughter (1920)
 Youth (1922)
 Judith (1923)
 The Fifth Street (1923)
 Time Is Money (1923)
 The Beautiful Girl (1923)
 Luther (1928)
 Guilty (1928)
 The Stranger (1931)
 A Shot at Dawn (1932)
 A Mad Idea (1932)
 And the Plains Are Gleaming (1933)
 Gold (1934)
 I Was Jack Mortimer (1935)
 Lady Windermere's Fan (1935)
 Victoria in Dover (1936)
 Tomfoolery (1936)
 A Wedding Dream (1936)
 Scandal at the Fledermaus (1936)
 A Hoax (1936)
 Donogoo Tonka (1936)
 Love's Awakening (1936)
 Togger (1937)
 Five Million Look for an Heir (1938)
 Marionette (1939)
 Anton the Last (1939)
 A Hopeless Case (1939)
 Our Miss Doctor (1940)
 Much Ado About Nixi (1942)
 The Rainer Case (1942)
 A Salzburg Comedy (1943)
 Heaven, We Inherit a Castle (1943)
 Die Fledermaus (1946)
 Friday the Thirteenth (1949)

References

Bibliography
 Youngkin, Stephen.  The Lost One: A Life of Peter Lorre. University Press of Kentucky, 2005.

External links 
 

1877 births
1945 deaths
German male film actors
German male stage actors
German male silent film actors
Male actors from Munich
20th-century German male actors